Internet recruiting is the act of scouring the Internet to locate both actively searching job seekers and also individuals who are content in their current position (these are called "passive candidates"). It is a field of dramatic growth and constant change that has given birth to a dynamic multibillion-dollar industry.

Traditionally, recruiters use large job boards, niche job boards, as well as social and business networking to locate these individuals. The immediate goal of Internet recruiting is to find individuals that a recruiter or company can present to hiring managers for the purpose of employment. Quite often, Internet recruiters have very short-term goals when it comes to recruiting online. The general catalyst that sparks this process is when a new job requisite comes in (called a REQ). The recruiter scans his or her database to see if anyone's resumes match the requirements. If not, they proceed to search on the Internet.

The challenge arises when recruiters contact passive candidates willy-nilly.  If a person is not currently seeking for a job, they generally have no interest in learning about new positions.  Excessive contacts of this nature could lead to complaints of spam. A far more logical way to approach Internet recruiting is for recruiters to view themselves as an authority site and answer the What's In It For Me (WIIFM) question that all individuals have: "What's in it for me to act upon your email"?

If a recruiter also offers resources such as career help, salary information, how to manage job stress, and the like, they break out of the stereotypical headhunter mode and enter into the "valued resource" mode to the individuals they contact.

Popular places for Internet recruiting
Internet recruiting can be successfully practiced on:
 Major search engines: Using boolean operators (AND, OR, NOT, etc.), related search syntax (parentheses for clauses, quotation marks around multiple-keyword phrases, etc.) and appropriate special commands (intitle:, :, site:, filetype:, etc.), one can generate very targeted search strings to find just the kinds of candidate resumes and/or prospect biographies desired.  These are typically most effective on major engines such as Google, Yahoo, Live, Exalead, etc., that each have billions of pages indexed as well as support for many special commands.
 Niche search engines and job boards:  In some cases, it can be more effective to use a more narrow search tool.  Blog-specific search engines such as Gigablast can deliver targeted results within that subset of the Internet. There has also been a proliferation of niche job boards that provide companies with candidates from specific career fields or backgrounds. Among notable niche job boards are MediaBistro, eFinancialCareers.com, Ivy Exec, and Execunet.com
 Discussion lists:  Similarly, using Google Groups (formerly Deja) to search Usenet postings can find unique results within newsgroup discussion lists.  Yahoo Groups, Topica, etc., are other online communities that each host millions of discussion lists which can be searched.  Many portals and individual association sites (see below) offer their own forums where posts (and their posters) can be searched.
 Other virtual communities:  LinkedIn, Spoke and [Xing.com] (formerly OpenBC) are currently the largest of the professionally skewed social networks with differing levels of depth on candidates, though some search capabilities are reserved for paid tier members only.  Other larger virtual communities, such as Facebook and [MySpace], contain a higher percentage of non-professional content.  As a result, these may be less efficient for recruiting purposes even when advanced search techniques are employed.

Association sites: Many local and regional association sites will have targeted niche job boards as a value-added benefit for their members, as well as member directories, local chapter contacts and other data useful for contact name generation/biographical details of passive candidates.
 Local business forums: Towns and cities will often have local business forums in which new jobs can be posted.
 Industry niche sites: Industry niche sites will not only generally have member resumes available but also include vendor lists, discussion forums, and the opportunity to write articles as a career advisor.
 Back to School Nights: The Parents-Teachers Association will often let local businesses advertise during back to school nights. It makes a good fund-raiser, and recruiters have instant access to local professionals.

References

E-recruitment